Eating mucus is the act of extracting dried nasal mucus with one's finger (rhinotillexis) and the succeeding action of ingesting the mucus from the nose-picking (mucophagy).

Health
Mucophagy comes with some health risks due to the potential physical aggravation resulting from the action of nose picking, and the germs on fingers and in mucus. Picking one's nose can cause upper airway irritation as well as other injuries including nasal septal perforation (a "through-and-through defect" of the cartilage separating the nostrils), and epistaxis (nosebleed). In a study by Andrade and Srihari, 25% of subjects were ailed by nose bleeds, 17% with nasal infections, and 2% with damage more serious than bleeding. W. Buzina studied the fungal diversity in nasal mucus in 2003. 104 samples were gathered with 331 identifiable strains of fungi and 9 different species per patient.

Possible reasons
The Obsessive–Compulsive Disorder Association of South Africa collectively concluded that nose picking (and mucophagy) are passing behaviors. Andrade and Srihari studied persons who were more apt to develop "habitual and obsessive–compulsive behaviors." They discovered that those with compulsive issues showed correlations between nose picking and self-mutilation motives. Diagnoses have also included passive–aggressive personality disorder and schizophrenia.

Mucophagy has also been referred to as a "tension phenomenon" based on children's ability to function in their environment. The different degrees of effectively fitting in socially may indicate psychiatric disorders or developmental stress reactions. However, most parents view these habits as pathological issues. Moreover, Andrade and Srihari cited a study performed by Sidney Tarachow of the State University of New York which reported that people who ate their boogers found them "tasty."

Stefan Gates in his book Gastronaut discusses eating dried nasal mucus, and says that 44% of people he questioned said they had eaten their own dried nasal mucus in adulthood and said they liked it. As mucus filters airborne contaminants, eating it could be thought to be unhealthy; Gates comments that "our body has been built to consume snot", because the nasal mucus is normally swallowed after being moved inside by the motion of the cilia.

See also
 Allergic salute (wiping of the nose with the hand)
 Neti (Hatha Yoga)
 Nasal irrigation
 Taboo

References

Body-focused repetitive behavior
Habit and impulse disorders
Mania
Rhinology